Florent Rondelé (13 January 1922 – 13 December 2000) was a Belgian racing cyclist. He rode in the 1948 Tour de France.

References

External links

1922 births
2000 deaths
Belgian male cyclists
Cyclists from East Flanders
People from Maarkedal
20th-century Belgian people